Rainy Days Never Stays is The Brilliant Green's thirteenth single, released in 2002. It peaked at #14 on the Oricon singles chart.

Track listing

References

2002 singles
The Brilliant Green songs
2002 songs
Songs written by Tomoko Kawase
Songs written by Shunsaku Okuda